The Copa del Rey is an annual knockout football competition in Spanish football, organized by the Royal Spanish Football Federation, held annually since 1903. The competition is open to La Liga and Segunda División teams, plus some qualifiers from lower levels.

Since the first final between Athletic Bilbao and Real Madrid, 119 single-match finals have taken place (the 1904 final was not held, whereas in 1910 and 1913 two parallel tournaments and finals were played due to disagreements between the FEF and the UCEF, both considered official). Four were replayed after the first games ended in a draw, with 25 others going to extra time and six of those requiring a penalty shootout to decide a winner. As of 2022, 34 different teams have competed in the final, with 14 of them winning them tournament at least once. On 18 occasions, the winning team also won La Liga (which began in 1929) in the same season, thus making a domestic double. Barcelona are the only team to win La Liga, the Copa del Rey and the UEFA Champions League in the same year, having done so twice in 2009 and 2015. The competition was not not held in 1937 and 1938 due to effects of the Spanish Civil War.

Barcelona hold the record for the most wins and most finals appearances, with 31 from 42 total appearances in the finals. Real Madrid hold the record for the most finals lost (20). Of the teams who have participated in more than one final, Español de Madrid and Celta Vigo share the worst win–loss record with three defeats and no victories each. Of the victorious teams, Arenas have the lowest percentage of success, winning one out of four finals (25%). Real Betis are the current champions, having won their third title in 2022.

Lionel Messi holds the records for most goals scored in finals (9), most finals scored by a player (7), most assists provided in finals (6), most appearances in finals (10, along with Sergio Busquets) and most man of the match awards won in finals (3). Messi and Busquets, along with Barcelona teammate Gerard Piqué and Agustín Gaínza of Athletic Bilbao, have the most player wins with 7. Telmo Zarra holds records for consecutive finals scored in (finding the net on each occasion between 1942 and 1945) and the most goals scored in a final (four, in 1950).

List of finals

Performances
Seasons in italics are runner-up seasons.

Notes

See also
Football records and statistics in Spain#Copa del Rey

References

External links
Official website at RFEF.es

 
Annual events in Spain
Copa del Rey
Copa del Rey